Lindsay Brown may refer to:
 Lindsay Brown (baseball)
 Lindsay Brown (accountant)